This was the first edition of the HP Open.

Samantha Stosur won her first career WTA singles title, defeating Francesca Schiavone in the final 7–5, 6–1.

Seeds

Draw

Finals

Top half

Bottom half

External links
 Main Draw
 Qualifying Draw

HP Open
- Singles, 2009 Hp Open